A. M. Velu Mudaliyar was an Indian politician and former Member of Parliament elected from Tamil Nadu. He was elected to the Lok Sabha from Arakkonam constituency as an Indian National Congress (Indira) candidate in 1980 election, and as a Tamil Maanila Congress (Moopanar) candidate in 1996 election.

References 

Tamil Nadu politicians
Living people
India MPs 1980–1984
India MPs 1996–1997
India MPs 2004–2009
Lok Sabha members from Tamil Nadu
Year of birth missing (living people)